Siarhei Lahun (May 27, 1988 – April 22, 2011) was a Belarusian weightlifter.

At the 2007 World Weightlifting Championships he ranked 10th in the 77 kg category, with a total of 342 kg.

He competed in Weightlifting at the 2008 Summer Olympics in the 77 kg division finishing tenth with 349 kg. This beat his previous personal best by 4 kg.

He died in a car crash on 23 April 2011. In this crash, the lifter Yauheni Zharnasek (BLR) also suffered severe injuries.

He was 5 ft 8 inches tall and weighed 88 kg (194 lb).

References

External links
NBC profile
 Athlete Biography LAHUN Siarhei at beijing2008

Belarusian male weightlifters
1988 births
2011 deaths
World Weightlifting Championships medalists
Weightlifters at the 2008 Summer Olympics
Olympic weightlifters of Belarus
21st-century Belarusian people